ZPO may refer to:
Zivilprozessordnung (Germany), the German code of civil procedure
Zivilprozessordnung (Austria), the Austrian code of civil procedure
Amatlán Zapotec, a Zapotec language